The following is a table of all songs recorded and/or written by Puddle of Mudd.

 The columns Title, Year, and Album list each song title, the year in which the song was recorded, and the official US studio album.
 The column Author(s) lists the writer(s) of each song.

There are 91 songs on this list.

Table

Notes and references

External links 

Puddle of Mudd